Doc C. Lewis (1843 – ?) was a farmer and state legislator in Texas. A Republican, he served from 1881 to 1883 during the Seventeenth Texas Legislature  in the Texas House of Representatives. He was one of four African American members of the Texas House at the time.

He lived in Wharton County and was 37 when elected to the Texas House.

See also
African-American officeholders during and following the Reconstruction era

References

1843 births
Year of death missing
People from Wharton County, Texas
Republican Party members of the Texas House of Representatives
African-American politicians during the Reconstruction Era